The Elwak–Mandera Road, is a rural road in Kenya. The road links Elwak, to the town of Mandera, in the country's extreme northeast, near the tri-point where the borders of Kenya, Ethiopia and Somalia meet.

Location
The road starts at Elwak, Mandera County, at the border with the town of El Wak, Somalia.

Overview
This road is an important transport corridor for traffic from Mombasa and Nairobi destined for Mandera. It also facilitates trade between Kenya and her neighbors to the north and northeast; Ethiopia and Somalia respectively. Travel along this road, although safer compared to a shorter route through Lafey, is longer in distance and bumpier, due to the rough condition of the road.

Updating to bitumen surface
In March 2016, the government of Kenya publicly committed to upgrading this gravel-surfaced road to class II bitumen surface with culverts, drainage channels and shoulders, before the end of 2018.

See also
 List of roads in Kenya

References

External links
 The Road to El Wak, Mandera

Roads in Kenya
Geography of Kenya
Transport in Kenya
Mandera County